Autoroute 132 links the A13 and Deauville & Trouville-sur-Mer.
It starts between exits 28 and 29a on the A13 and ends in the outskirts of Touques, just south of the village of Canapville on the N177.

The motorway is operated by the Société des Autoroutes de Paris Normandie (SAPN). Junctions on the A132 are not numbered.

List of junctions

Projects are afoot to extend the A132 to Deauville by circumventing Canapville to the West and by building the motorway along the railway line up to the station on the D513. A junction would be built on the D27 to link Dives-sur-Mer, Houlgate and Touques.

SAPN has a maintenance depot in Pont-l'Évêque along with the motorway French Gendarmerie.

External links

A132 autoroute in Saratlas

References

A132